Tuga Airport  is an airstrip serving Bagudo in Nigeria.

See also
Transport in Nigeria
List of airports in Nigeria

References

External links
OpenStreetMap - Tuga

Airports in Nigeria